Fatma Sultan ("One who abstains"; 22 September 1704 – May 1733), was an Ottoman princess, daughter of Sultan Ahmed III and his BaşKadin (first Imperial consort) Emetullah Kadın. She was politically active and influential on the affairs of state during the late Tulip era (1703–1730).

Early life
Fatma Sultan was born on 22 September 1704 in the Topkapı Palace. Her father was Sultan Ahmed III, and her mother was Emetullah Kadın. She was the eldest child and daughter born to her father. She was also his favorite child. She had long, black hair and dark eyes.

First marriage
In 1709, at the age of five, Ahmed betrothed her to Silahdar (Şehid) Ali Pasha. The wedding took place on 11 May 1709, until 16 May in the Topkapı Palace. In the meantime, Silahdar Ali Pasha was given the rank of vizier and kaymakam. On 16 May, Fatma was taken from the Topkapı Palace to the Valide Sultan's palace in Eyüp, which was allocated for the wedding. The wedding lasted until 20 May.

Silahdar Ali Pasha became Grand Vizier in 1713. However, he died in 1716, when Fatma was twelve years old.

Second marriage
In 1717, when Fatma was thirteen, Ahmed arranged her marriage to Nevşehirli Ibrahim Pasha. For the wedding, Ibrahim received a sable fur coat from the sultan on February 22, 1717. The wedding took place on 22 February 1717 in Edirne. Ibrahim Pasha was fifty years old at that time, older than her father, and had divorced his first wife in order to marry the princess. The marriage was consummated only a few years later, as Fatma was too young. Just over a year later, Ibrahim Pasha took over as grand vezir on 9 May 1718.

Despite the age difference, the marriage was very happy. Ibrahim was very much in love with his wife and was happy to grant her every request, while Fatma was famous for being incredibly jealous of her husband and constantly asked her father to tell her if he was faithful to her or not.

By 1724 Ibrahim Pasha and Fatma had several palaces at different locations. Following their marriage in 1717, the one across from the Kiosk of Processions on the landwalls of the Topkapı Palace, which had long housed many grand vezirs, grew into a monumental complex as Ibrahim Pasha and Fatma continued to annex nearby palaces, and busied themselves with restoring and rebuilding them.

Ibrahim Pasha stated his longing for Fatma Sultan with a poem. Pasha explains this love and sorrow in one place: 

She was described as having had a large political influence on both her father, who left the ruling to her husband, and on her husband, the Grand Vizier. Some sources regard her as the real ruler of the later part of the Tulip era. She often acted as an intermediary between foreign ambassadors and her father or husband. A French ambassador complained that obtaining his favor was the only way to obtain an audience with the sultan and the Grand Vizier.

Fatma favored the French and intervened several times on their behalf. She obtained the release of an imprisoned French consul, who in exchange gave her three diamond buttons. In addition, he introduced certain French customs and behaviors to the court, including fashion. She was said to have assisted the Marquis de Villeneuve, French ambassador to the Ottoman Empire from 1728 to 1741, in favour of an Ottoman policy benefitting to French interests during the Russo-Austrian-Turkish War (1735–1739).

She has been referred to as the last really influent princess of the Ottoman Empire.

The couple spent several happy and affluent years during the notorious for its splendidness and lavishness Tulip Age (Lâle Devri) which became the symbol of the reign of Sultan Ahmed III. The two together had a two sons and two daughters.

Fatma Sultan was widowed in 1730, when her husband Ibrahim Pasha, who was sixty-four years old, was killed during the Patrona Halil revolt, which led to the deposition of her father Sultan Ahmed. She was twenty-six years old.

After the revolt and the ascension to the throne of her nephew Mahmud I, son of Mustafa II, her possessions and wealth were seized and she was exiled to the Çırağan Palace, because the government feared that she might act to put her father back on the throne.

Issue
By her second marriage, Fatma Sultan had two sons and two daughters:
Sultanzade Mehmed Paşah (1718? - 16 June 1778)
Sultanzade Genç Mehmed Bey (March 1723 - 1737)
Fatma Hanımsultan (? - 1765). She had a son, Mehmed Bey, who married his cousin Hatice Hanımsultan, daughter of Saliha Sultan. 
Heybetullah Hanımsultan (? - 1774)

Charities
In 1727, Fatma Sultan commissioned a fountain near the Ibrahim Pasha Palace, which bears her name. In 1728, she also commissioned a fountain near the Cedid Valide Sultan Mosque in Üsküdar. During her lifetime she founded waqfs in the capital bequeathing mülk properties she had received from her father.

She also commissioned a mosque known as "Fatma Sultan Mosque", located in Eminönü district in Istanbul. Nevşehirli Ibrahim Pashacommissioned a palace near this mescid, Fatma Sultan repaired the mosque and added from the land of her palace and built a large mosque.

Death
Fatma Sultan died at the age of twenty eight in May 1733, and was buried in the mausoleum of Turhan Sultan in New Mosque, Istanbul.

In popular culture
In the 2012 Turkish historical television series Bir Zamanlar Osmanlı: Kıyam, Fatma Sultan is portrayed by Turkish actress Leyla Göksun.

Ancestry

References

Sources

1704 births
18th-century Ottoman princesses
1733 deaths